Edwin "Eddie" Marshall (April 13, 1938 – September 7, 2011) was an American jazz drummer.

Biography
Marshall was born in Springfield, Massachusetts.  He played in his father's swing group and in R&B bands while in high school. He moved to New York City in 1956, developing his percussion style under the influence of Max Roach and Art Blakey. Two years later he played in the quartet of Charlie Mariano and with Toshiko Akiyoshi; after two years' service in the Army, he returned to play with Akiyoshi again in 1965. He worked with Mike Nock for a year in the house band of the New York nightclub The Dom, and also worked with Stan Getz and Sam Rivers, and accompanied Dionne Warwick on tours.

In 1967 he was a member of The Fourth Way, a fusion group which included Nock, Michael White, and Ron McClure. This group toured the San Francisco Bay Area through the early 1970s; after this Marshall played with Jon Hendricks and The Pointer Sisters.

Marshall was a member of the group Almanac with Bennie Maupin (flute, tenor saxophone), Cecil McBee (bass) and Mike Nock (piano). They released one album in 1977.

In the 1980s he worked in the project Bebop & Beyond, who recorded tribute albums to Dizzy Gillespie and Thelonious Monk.

Marshall underwent heart surgery in 1984, temporary sidelining his career, but he continued to perform on the recorder. He then taught at the San Francisco School of the Arts, and issued his second release as a leader in 1999. In the 2000s he worked on the San Francisco Arts Commission.

Marshall died of a heart attack on September 7, 2011. Marshall was survived by his wife, Sue Trupin, his five sons, Andre, Alcide, Jeru and David Marshall and Andre Charles, and his stepson, Reevan Trupin.

Discography

As leader
Dance of the Sun (Timeless Muse, 1977)
Holy Mischief (1999)

As sideman
With Toshiko Akiyoshi
Long Yellow Road (Asahi Sonorama, 1961)
Toshiko Mariano Quartet (Candid, 1961)
With Kenny Burrell
Sky Street (Fantasy, 1975)
With John Handy
Where Go the Boats (Warner Bros., 1978)
With Eddie Harris
Sounds Incredible (Angelaco, 1980)
Exploration (Chiaroscuro, 1983)
With Bobby Hutcherson
Waiting (Blue Note, 1976)
The View from the Inside (Blue Note, 1976)
Highway One (Columbia, 1978)
Conception: The Gift of Love (Columbia, 1979)
Ambos Mundos (Landmark, 1989)
With Ahmad Jamal
Genetic Walk (20th Century, 1975)
With John Klemmer
Waterfalls (Impulse!, 1972)
Magic and Movement (Impulse!, 1974)
With Art Pepper
San Francisco Samba (Contemporary, 1977 [1997])
With Archie Shepp
California Meeting: Live on Broadway (Soul Note, 1985)
With Sonny Simmons
Manhattan Egos (Arhoolie, 1969 / 2000)
With Paul Contos Group
Points Unknown (Park Ave Records, 1984)

References

External links
[ Eddie Marshall] at Allmusic

1938 births
2011 deaths
Musicians from Springfield, Massachusetts
American jazz drummers
Timeless Records artists
Jazz musicians from Massachusetts
Bebop & Beyond members
Almanac (band) members
The Fourth Way (band) members
Improvising Artists Records artists